Cinderella and the Secret Prince, also known as Cinderella 3D, is a 2018 American 3D computer-animated fantasy adventure film directed by Lynne Southerland from a screenplay by Francis Glebas, Alice Blehart, Stephanie Bursill and Russell Fung, based on the Brothers Grimm version of the fairytale "Cinderella". Internationally, it grossed $12,143,896 against a budget of $20,000,000.

Premise 
During the Royal Ball, Cinderella meets the prince in hopes of marrying him. However, he turns out to be incredibly rude and mean-spirited. She and her three mice friends then discover that the real prince has in fact been turned into a mouse by an evil witch and replaced by a fraud; now she and her mice have to rescue him and turn him back into a human before it's too late.

Sequel 
The Sequel to Little Sorcerer (2021)

See also 
List of American theatrical animated feature films (2000-2019)

References

External links 

2018 animated films
2018 films
2018 3D films
American animated films
American children's fantasy films
American children's adventure films
American children's animated fantasy films
American romantic fantasy films
American animated feature films
Animated films about mice
Animated romance films
Films about princesses
Films about royalty
Films about weddings
Films set in palaces
2010s English-language films
2010s American films